Elmer Jacob Burkett (December 1, 1867May 23, 1935) was a Representative and a Senator from Nebraska.

Burkett was born on a farm near Glenwood, Iowa. He attended the public schools and graduated from Tabor College in 1890 and from the University of Nebraska–Lincoln College of Law in 1893.  He served as principal of the Leigh, Nebraska, public schools from 1890–1892; he was admitted to the bar in 1893 and commenced practice in Lincoln, Nebraska. Burkett was a trustee of Tabor College from 1895-1905.  He was a member of the Nebraska House of Representatives 1896-1898.

Burkett was elected as a Republican to the Fifty-sixth, Fifty-seventh, and Fifty-eighth Congresses (March 4, 1899 – March 4, 1905); he was reelected to the Fifty-ninth Congress, but resigned, effective March 4, 1905, to become a Senator. He was elected as a Republican to the United States Senate and served from March 4, 1905 to March 3, 1911.  During his term, he served as the chairman of the Committee on Indian Depredations (Fifty-ninth Congress) and on the Committee on Pacific Railroads (Fifty-ninth through Sixty-first Congresses).  Burkett was an unsuccessful candidate for renomination in 1910. He then resumed the practice of law in Lincoln; he declined the candidacy for Governor of Nebraska in 1912, and was also an unsuccessful candidate for the Vice Presidential nomination in 1912 after the death of incumbent James S. Sherman.  He died in Lincoln on May 23, 1935, and was interred in Wyuka Cemetery.

References

1867 births
1935 deaths
Nebraska lawyers
University of Nebraska College of Law alumni
Republican Party members of the Nebraska House of Representatives
Republican Party United States senators from Nebraska
People from Glenwood, Iowa
Politicians from Lincoln, Nebraska
Republican Party members of the United States House of Representatives from Nebraska
Tabor College (Iowa) alumni
19th-century American politicians
20th-century American politicians